The 2000 UCI Road World Cup was the twelfth edition of the UCI Road World Cup. It was won by Erik Zabel.

Races

Final standings

Individual

Team

References

 Final classification for individuals and teams from memoire-du-cyclisme.eu

 
 
UCI Road World Cup (men)